Cancello e Arnone (also spelled Cancello ed Arnone or Cancello Arnone) (Campanian:  or ) is a comune (municipality) in the Province of Caserta in the Italian region Campania, located about  northwest of Naples and about  west of Caserta.

Geography
The municipality borders Casal di Principe, Castel Volturno, Falciano del Massico, Grazzanise, Mondragone and Villa Literno.

It has no hamlets (frazioni), and is composed by the former villages of Cancello and Arnone, merged in a single settlement.

References

External links

Official website

Cities and towns in Campania